Charitybuzz is an internet company which raises funds for nonprofit organizations through online charity auctions with celebrities and brands.  Auction experiences include music, entertainment, business, politics, sports, art, fashion and other industries. Charitybuzz keeps 20 percent of the proceeds of each auction.

The company was founded in 2005. As of December 2019, the company has raised more than $400 million for charity.

History
Coppy Holzman founded Charitybuzz out of his Westport, Connecticut, home in April 2005 with partners Serena Chew and Brad Reisner. After a conversation with Chevy Chase and President Bill Clinton at a reception to benefit the Clinton Library in late 2004.  They launched Charitybuzz a few months later with one employee and a directive from Chase to raise funds for The Center for Environmental Education. Holzman and his team persuaded 70 celebrities and luxury brands into donating meet-and-greets, VIP tickets, vacations and other gifts for the company's first auction. The first experience auctioned was a Caddyshack golf outing with Bill Murray and Chase. After a segment with Chase on the TODAY show, the online auction site raised $250,000 within two weeks. After its initial success, Charitybuzz's business grew quickly through word of mouth.

Holzman ran Charitybuzz part-time until the fall of 2007, when he committed to operating the business full-time and moved the company out of his home and into an office space. In 2008, he registered Charitybuzz as a sub-chapter S in Delaware.

Soon after, during the height of the recession in 2009, the company marked $100 million in bids and one million unique visitors. By 2010, with more than 1,500 online charity auctions complete, Charitybuzz doubled in size by expanding its focus to include corporate philanthropy support.  The company subsequently moved its headquarters and staff from Connecticut to an 8,000 square foot office at 437 Fifth Avenue in New York City.

In early 2012, Charitybuzz added Macy's chief stores officer Peter Sachse to its board of directors. In 2012, Charitybuzz launched a new celebrity concierge service for charity called "Do Good Dream Big," where bidders could request customized celebrity access for a minimum donation of $20,000.

Charitybuzz unveiled an updated logo in April 2013.  In September 2013, Patrick Farrell was appointed chief operating officer, a new position within Charitybuzz

In November 2013, Charitybuzz marked $100 million raised for nonprofits and celebrated by ringing the bell at the New York Stock Exchange on Black Friday.

In 2014, Charitybuzz raised $30 million for its nonprofit partners, bringing its total raised since inception in 2005 to $130 million. Celebrities including Bruce Springsteen and Matthew McConaughey supported their favorite causes to raise money for organizations including the RFK Center for Justice and Human Rights, Gabrielle's Angel Foundation for Cancer Research, WhyHunger, Sweet Relief Musicians Fund, The Kristen Ann Carr Fund and more. The top lots from 2014 included the opportunity to meet Sir Paul McCartney backstage which sold for $105,000 for the MTV Staying Alive Foundation and Coffee with Journey's Steve Perry which sold for $75,000 to benefit City of Hope.

In 2015, Charitybuzz was acquired by Todd Wagner, the CEO and Founder of Chideo. In 2016, Charitybuzz became a subsidiary of The Charity Network, founded by Todd Wagner.

Business model
By auctioning luxury items and celebrity-backed experiences through the internet to bidders worldwide, Charitybuzz is able to raise funds for foundations and nonprofits.  Charitybuzz's staff of 40 provides auction services for more than 3,200 nonprofit clients, as well as cause marketing support for many for-profit brands looking to enhance their corporate philanthropy programs. At the end of each auction, Charitybuzz keeps 20 percent to cover its operating costs.

Notable offerings auctioned

Charitybuzz auctions have included:

2017 

 Lunch with Apple's services chief Eddy Cue at the company's newly constructed Apple Park headquarters. Final bid: $26,000.

2016 

 Holy Popemobile! The Fiat that drove Pope Francis through NYC was auctioned. Proceeds will support Catholic schools and charities, as well as the international organizations Catholic Relief Services and Catholic Near East Welfare Association. Final bid: $300,000.

2015 

 One-of-a-Kind LeBron James Customized 2015 Kia K900 Luxury Sedan to benefit LeBron James Family Foundation. Final bid: $111.000
Lunch with Apple CEO Tim Cook at Apple Headquarters to benefit the Robert F. Kennedy Center for Justice and Human Rights. Final bid: $200,000.

 Caddy for Rickie Fowler at the Farmer's Insurance Open Pro-Am in La Jolla, CA. to benefit Communities in School and DonorsChoose. Final bid: $17,000.

2014 

 Meet Steve Perry for coffee in Los Angeles. Final bid: $75,000.
Meet Justin Timberlake on World Tour. Final bid: $25,250.

 Meet Sir Paul McCartney backstage at a US concert. Final bid: $105,000.

 Meet Apples CVP of Software and Services Eddy Cue at Apple Headquarters for lunch. Final bid: $85,000.

 Meet Jim Carrey at Dumb and Dumber To premiere. Final bid: $30,250.

 Visit the Fast Money set and meet Melissa Lee. Final bid: $41,000.

 Buy signed guitar used by Dave Matthews in 1991 – 1992. Final bid: $41,000.

 Lunch with Ben Bernanke, the former chairman of the Federal Reserve to benefit the Robert F. Kennedy Center for Justice and Human Rights. Final bid: $70,500.

2013 

 Coffee with Apple CEO Tim Cook at Apple Headquarters in Cupertino, CA to benefit the Robert F. Kennedy Center for Justice and Human Rights. Final bid: $610,000
 Be one of the first in the U.S. to own a Lamborghini Aventador to benefit One Drop Foundation. Final bid: $610,000
Private tennis lesson with Rafael Nadal to benefit the Rafael Nadal Foundation. Final bid: $150,000.
Lunch with Yahoo! CEO Marissa Mayer at Yahoo!´s headquarters. Final bid: $91,000.

 A walk-on role in the Superman vs. Batman film with Ben Affleck, Henry Cavill and Amy Adams. Final bid: $45,000.

 Meet Julia Robert for lunch at the Soho House West Hollywood. Final bid: $40,000.

 Meet Howard Stern and team, and sit in on The Howard Stern Show. Final bid: $52,000.
Meet Katy Perry at an upcoming show. Final bid: $66,000.

2012 

 Spend a day with President Bill Clinton in New York City. Final bid: $80,000.
Meet Bono after backstage show of U2 from VIP seats to benefit J/P Haitian Relief Organization, Happy Hearts Fund and Artists for Peace and Justice. Final bid: $212,000
Meet Taylor Swift in Ottawa with two VIP concert tickets and round trip airfare. Final bid: $30,000.
Sit ringside with Mike Tyson at the Pacquiao vs. Marquez fight in Las Vegas. Final bid: $28,000.
Lunch with George Clooney and Dace Karger at Soho House West Hollywood. Final bid: $58,000.
Lunch with Michael R. Bloomberg in New York City, NY to benefit The Humane Society of the United States. Final bid: $185,000
 Lifetime Membership to All Current and Future Trump National Golf Courses to benefit Donald J. Trump Foundation. Final bid: $185,000
 Meet Jeremy Lin after watching the Knicks at Madison Square Garden from VIP seats and take home his game-worn jersey. Final bid: $42,388

 Private one-hour tennis lesson with Andre Agassi and Stefanie Graf in Las Vegas. Final bid: $43,000.

2011 

 The chance to spend a day shadowing former President Bill Clinton  to benefit the Clinton Foundation. Final bid: $250,000 (2011)
 A meet-and-greet with Oprah Winfrey before the last taping of her talk show to benefit the Robert F. Kennedy Center for Justice and Human Rights. Final bid: $105,000 (2011)
 Attend both the Elton John AIDS Foundation Dinner and the Vanity Fair Oscar Party to benefit the Natural Resources Defense Council. Final bid: $100,000 (2011)
 Pitch your big idea to Rupert Murdoch to benefit the Global Poverty Project. Final bid: $85,000 (2011)
 A private singing with Paul Simon to benefit the Children's Health Fund. Final Bid: $75,000 (2011)
 Front-row VIP seats to a Paul McCartney concert at Yankee Stadium and the chance to meet him backstage to benefit the Green Schools Initiative. Final bid: $70,000
 A behind-the-scenes tour of Facebook's headquarters with Company Director Blake Ross to benefit the Peace Corps. Final bid: $70,000 (2011)
 Meet legendary German designer Karl Lagerfeld at the Chanel Couture fashion show in Paris to benefit Runway to Green. Final bid: $65,000 (2011)
 Join Harrison Ford as his co-pilot during a flight over California to benefit Conservation International. Final bid:$65,000 (2011)
 A walk-on role on AMC's Mad Men to benefit the American Civil Liberties Union of Southern California. Final bid: $60,000 (2011)
 The chance to sit in on The Howard Stern Show at Sirius Radio and meet the host to benefit Rosie's Theater Kids. Final bid: $55,000 (2011)
 Take home Lady Gaga's signed Steinway Piano, used during her performance for the Robin Hood Foundation gala, to benefit Ten O'Clock Classics. Final bid: $42,500 (2011)
 Sit courtside with Jay-Z at a Nets vs. Knicks game to benefit the Stephen Gaynor School. Final bid: $42,000 (2011)
 Meet Taylor Swift backstage at the concert of your choice to benefit the Robert F. Kennedy Center. Final bid: $37,600 (2011)

2010 

 The very first Chevrolet Volt off the production line to benefit Detroit Public Schools. Final bid: $225,000 (2010)
Audemars Piguet Royal Oak Offshore Las Vegas Strip Tourbillon Limited Edition Watch signed by Jay-Z to benefit Broadway Cares. Final bid: $220,000 (2010)
Audemars Piguet Lady Millenary Astrologia Limited Edition Watch signed by Meryl Streep sold twice to benefit Broadway Cares. Final bid: $100,000 (2010)
 Meet Paul McCartney at the Apollo Theater to benefit the Green Schools Initiative. Final bid: $130,000 (2010)
 Meet Robert Pattinson of the set of Twilight: Breaking Dawn to benefit the GO Campaign. Final bid: $85,000 (2010)
 Play golf with Tom Watson to benefit The Pink Pony Fund. Final bid: $80,500 (2010)
 Play golf with President Bill Clinton to benefit Christie's Green Auction. Final bid: $80,000 (2010)
 Get a backstage tour from U2's The Edge to benefit Gabrielle's Angel Foundation. Final bid: $80,000 (2010)
 Meet Prince William at the Chakravarty Cup to benefit the Chakravarty Cup. Final bid: $71,250
 Watch Simon Doonan create the Barney's Christmas windows to benefit Christie's Green Auction. Final bid: $60,000 (2010)
 Be Sir Elton John's guest at his star-studded Oscar party to benefit the Robert F. Kennedy Center for Justice and Human Rights. Final bid: $52,000 (2010)
 Meet Ralph Lauren at New York Fashion Week to benefit The Pink Pony Fund. Final bid: $51,000 (2010)
 Have Shepard Fairey paint your portrait to benefit the Robert F. Kennedy Center. Final bid: $45,000 (2010)
 Spend a week interning at Vogue and meet Anna Wintour to benefit the Robert F. Kennedy Center. Final bid:  $42,500 (2010)
 Meet James Cameron at a private viewing of Avatar to benefit MUSE Elementary School. Final bid: $42,500 (2010)

Awards 
The Charity Network was named one of Fast Company's Most Innovative Companies in the not-for-profit space in 2017.

References

External links
 

Companies based in New York City
Internet properties established in 2005
Online auction websites of the United States
Charity fundraising
2005 establishments in New York City